Swedish Air Force Historic Flight (abbreviated in Swedish as SwAFHF  ) is an association that flies former Swedish Air Force aircraft and maintains them in an airworthy condition. SwAFHF has been active since 1998 and is housed in premises of the Skaraborg Wing (F 7). SwAFHF is authorized by the Swedish Civil Aviation Administration and the aircraft have civilian Swedish aircraft registration.

Aircraft operated by SwAFHF
Sk 16 Noorduyn Harvard - SE-FUB, SE-FVU
J 29 Saab 29 Tunnan - SE-DXB
J 34 Hawker Hunter - SE-DXM (former Swiss Air Force J-4082)
J 32 Saab 32 Lansen - SE-RMD, SE-RME, SE-RMF
Sk 35C Saab 35 Draken - SE-DXP
J 35J Saab 35 Draken - SE-DXR
AJS 37 Saab 37 Viggen - SE-DXN
Sk 37 Saab 37 Viggen - SE-DXO
Sk 50 Saab 91 Safir - SE-FVV, SE-EDD
Sk 60 Saab 105 - SE-DXG
Sk 61 Scottish Aviation Bulldog. - SE-FVX
Cessna 550 - SE-RMI
Piper PA23 Aztec - SE-IHR

Other aircraft, not airworthy or on the CAA register, include a Saab 32 Lansen.

References

External links

SwAFHF on Instagram
SwAFHF on Youtube
SwAFHF on Facebook

Swedish Air Force
Air force history